The Vice (German: Das Laster) is a 1915 German silent drama film directed by Richard Oswald and starring Alfred Abel, Rosa Valetti and Arthur Wellin.

It was shot at the Weissensee Studios in Berlin.

Cast
 Alfred Abel as Paul 
 Rosa Valetti as Mutter 
 Arthur Wellin
 Marianne Wulff
 Rezia Markoff

References

Bibliography
 Bock, Hans-Michael & Bergfelder, Tim. The Concise CineGraph. Encyclopedia of German Cinema. Berghahn Books, 2009.

External links
 

1915 films
Films of the German Empire
German silent feature films
Films directed by Richard Oswald
German black-and-white films
1915 drama films
German drama films
Films about alcoholism
Silent drama films
1910s German films
Films shot at Weissensee Studios
1910s German-language films